K. L. A. Ranasinghe Silva was the 41st Surveyor General of Sri Lanka. He was appointed in 1996, succeeding M. P. Salgado, and held the office until 2003. He was succeeded by P. A. Ariyaratne.

References

S